The Pedro Anchustegui Pelota Court is a Basque pelota court located on West 2nd North Street in Mountain Home, Idaho. The court was built in 1908 during a period of Basque immigration to Idaho. Basque immigrants largely settled in the Boise and Mountain Home regions, where they herded sheep; Basque pelota, a sport similar to handball, was one of their main forms of recreation. The Pedro Anchustegui Pelota Court is the only outdoor Basque pelota court remaining in Idaho.

The court was added to the National Register of Historic Places on January 30, 1978.

References

Basque pelota in the United States
Basque-American culture in Idaho
Buildings and structures in Elmore County, Idaho
Event venues on the National Register of Historic Places in Idaho
Fronton (court)
Sports venues in Idaho
National Register of Historic Places in Elmore County, Idaho
Mountain Home, Idaho
Sports venues on the National Register of Historic Places in Idaho